Sawnee EMC (SEMC; founded as Forsyth County EMC) is an electrical generation and transmission cooperative founded in July 1938 and based in Cumming, Georgia. , Sawnee EMC is the third-largest electric co-op in Georgia and the eighth-largest in the United States, operating 11,982 miles of power lines in seven counties: Cherokee, Dawson, Forsyth, Fulton, Gwinnett, Hall, and Lumpkin. It is a member of the National Rural Electric Cooperative Association and Touchstone Energy.

Michael Goodroe is the president and CEO of Sawnee EMC.

History 
After the Rural Electrification Administration was created in 1935, the Forsyth County Electric Membership Corporation was incorporated on July 16, 1938, and the co-op began providing electricity to about 750 homes via 163 miles of power lines on June22, 1939. Forsyth County EMC changed its name to Sawnee EMC in August 1950, taking its name from nearby Sawnee Mountain. In 1974, Sawnee EMC was one of the dozens of Georgia-based EMCs that founded Oglethorpe Power, and Sawnee was similarly a founding member of the renewables-focused Green Power EMC in 2001.

Board of directors 
Sawnee EMC's board of directors is composed of nine elected members:

Foundation 
Sawnee EMC operates the Sawnee Electric Membership Foundation, which donates to schools and charities in its service area. Since 2003, the foundation has given out $3.8 million.

References

External links 

 

Electric cooperatives of the United States
Electric cooperatives in Georgia (U.S. state)
Electric generation and transmission cooperatives in the United States